Claudius Cayx-Dumas (1724–1792) was a French Jesuit. He joined the Society of Jesus in 1757.

References

1724 births
1792 deaths
French beatified people
18th-century French Jesuits
French clergy killed in the French Revolution